Asteropsis may refer to:
 Asteropsis (echinoderm) Müller & Troschel, 1840, a genus of sea stars in the family Asteropseidae
 Asteropsis Perrier, 1875, a genus of sea stars in the family Asteropseidae; synonym of Petricia
 Asteropsis (plant), a genus in the family Asteraceae